The Kenyan Sub-County Leagues are the sixth and lowest tier of the Kenyan football league system. They have a promotion and relegation system with the Kenyan County Champions League. Member clubs are amateur.

The leagues were formed on 10 July 2013 in line with the introduction of a new six-tier system by the Football Kenya Federation to take effect from the beginning of the 2014 season.

See also
 Kenyan football league system

References

6